Jesse Boot, 1st Baron Trent (2 June 1850 – 13 June 1931) transformed The Boots Company, founded by his father, John Boot, into a national retailer, which branded itself as "Chemists to the Nation".

Biography

John Boot sold his controlling interest to American investors in 1920. Boot offered his close friend and business associate John Harston, the opportunity of going into business with him, but Harston declined, feeling the venture was not worth investing in. Boot was a great benefactor to the City of Nottingham.

In 1920, his son, Jesse Boot, purchased, and presented to the City of Nottingham, 36 acres of open land that lay along the northern side of the Victoria Embankment alongside the River Trent, opposite Plaisaunce, Jesse Boot's summer house which was demolished in 1961. 

Initially named the 'New Park', it was laid out with grass and trees, and provided a barrier against flooding as well as a pleasant walkway alongside the river. As part of the development an imposing war memorial gateway was built, with the aid of funds from Jesse Boot. He also donated land for the new University College at Highfields, now the University of Nottingham, which opened in 1928. and was presented with the Freedom of the City of Nottingham in 1920. He was also a significant benefactor to his wife's home, Jersey.

Boot was knighted in 1909, created a baronet in 1917, and announced in the New Year's Honours of 1929 was elevated to the peerage, and created Baron Trent, of Nottingham in the County of Nottingham on 18 March 1929. 

These latter honours probably owed as much to his solid support of the Liberal Party as to his philanthropy to the city of his birth.

He died in Jersey in 1931. The Sir Jesse Boot Chair in Chemistry at the University of Nottingham was named in his honour. His widow commissioned the French glass artist René Lalique to refit the church of St Matthew, Millbrook (popularly known as the "Glass Church") as a memorial to him.

In 1935 a Primary school was built in Nottingham, Jesse Boot's home town. The School was titled The Jesse Boot Primary School and was located in Bakersfield, Nottingham. The School closed in 2009 after becoming an academy school.

His portrait, by Noel Denholm Davis, is in the collection of the University of Nottingham. Another, by the same artist, is on loan to the National Portrait Gallery.

Bibliography

Arms

References

External links
 Portrait by Noel Denholm Davis
 Biography – on Boots corporate website
 Boots family philanthropy – on Boots corporate website
 Chemists to the Nation – article in Pharmaceutical Journal

1850 births
1931 deaths
Barons in the Peerage of the United Kingdom
British retail company founders
Boot, Jesse
Boot, Jesse
Boot, Jesse
People associated with the University of Nottingham
People educated at Nottingham High School
People from Nottingham
Barons created by George V